Tejinder Singh "Babbu" Maan (born 29 March 1975) is an Indian singer-songwriter, music director, actor and film producer. Most of his artistic work focuses on Punjabi music and films. He is recognised as being among the biggest artists in Punjabi music.

Early life
Maan was born as Tejinder Maan on in the village of Khant Maanpur in the Fatehgarh Sahib district of Punjab on 29 March 1975.

Career

Maan's main target audience is the Punjabi-speaking population of the world. Since 1999, he has released eight studio albums and six compilation albums; has written screenplays for, acted in and produced Punjabi films; and has contributed significantly to regional and Bollywood film soundtracks. Maan is the ambassador for One Hope, One Chance, a non-profit organisation based out of Punjab.

Music
Babbu Maan recorded his first album Sajjan Rumaal De Geya in 1997 but revised and re-released most of the songs in his subsequent albums. Maan's first official debut album Tu Meri Miss India was released in 1999.

In 2001, Babbu Maan released his third album Saaun Di Jhadi, featuring songs such as Chan Chanani, Raat Guzarlayi, Dil Ta Pagal Hai, Ishq, Kabza and Touch Wood, and in 2003, he wrote and sang for his first film soundtrack Hawayein where he worked alongside Indian playback singers Sukhwinder Singh and Jaspinder Narula. Maan released his fourth album Ohi Chann Ohi Rataan in 2004, followed by Pyaas in 2005, one of the best-selling Punjabi albums of the time. In 2007, Maan released his first Hindi album entitled Mera Gham, and in 2009, his first religious album Singh Better Than King. A song from the latter, Baba Nanak, a reaction to fake saints and preachers in Punjab, caused various debates about the growing phenomenon in the state. In 2010 he won "Best International Artist" at the Brit Asia TV Music Awards.

On 4 July 2013, Maan released Talaash: In Search of Soul, his first Punjabi commercial album after eight years. The album entered top 10 in World Albums chart by Billboard. In 2015, the album named Itihaas was released and in 2018 Ik C Pagal was released.

In addition to Hawayein, Babbu Maan has sung in Punjabi films Waagah and Dil Tainu Karda Ae Pyar as well as for Bollywood productions Vaada Raha, Crook, Saheb, Biwi Aur Gangster, Titoo MBA, and 31st October.

Babbu Maan has performed in shows across Asia, Australasia, Europe, North America and the Middle East. In 2014, Maan was a winner of four World Music Awards: World's Best Indian Male Artist, World's Best Indian Live Act, World's Best Indian Entertainer and World's Best Indian Album for Talaash: In Search of Soul.

Maan also won two daf BAMA Music Awards Germany in 2017.

Films
Babbu Maan debuted in a supporting role in Hawayein, a 2003 film based on the 1984 anti-Sikh riots. Although banned in India, the film was a success overseas. In 2006, Maan starred in his first Punjabi film as the main lead in Rabb Ne Banaiyan Jodiean. Dissatisfied with certain scenes and the fate of the film, Maan returned to form in 2008 with Hashar (A Love Story). He has since written, produced and acted in his own films Ekam, Hero Hitler in Love and Desi Romeos. Babbu Maan is a partner in Maan Films Pvt. Ltd, and in 2010, constructed a film set called Ishqpura in his native village. In 2018, he acted in the film Banjara which is based on the life of truck drivers.

Clothing brand 
Babbu Maan launched his own clothing brand named The Babbu Maan Store, which has more than 20 stores in Punjab, India.

Discography

Studio albums

Singles

Film songs

Punjabi

Bollywood

Filmography

References

External links

Living people
1975 births
Punjabi-language singers
Male actors in Punjabi cinema
21st-century Indian male actors
Male actors from Punjab, India
Indian male voice actors
Punjabi music